Club Deportivo Tenerife, S.A.D. is a Spanish football club based in Santa Cruz de Tenerife, Tenerife, in the Canary Islands. Founded in 1912, the club plays in the Segunda División, holding home matches at the Estadio Heliodoro Rodríguez López, with a 22,824-seat capacity. The traditional home colours are white shirts and blue shorts.

Tenerife has a history playing in the top flight of La Liga. They have been promoted to the top tier on four occasions, including a 10-year stint from 1989 to 1999. The club managed to finish as high as fifth in the league table on two occasions during that period, which qualified them for the first round of the UEFA Cup. They most recently played in La Liga in the 2009–10 season.

Being based in the Canary archipelago off the Atlantic coast of Africa, while playing its away games on the Spanish mainland, both the club and rival Las Palmas from Gran Canaria are two of the most geographically isolated European professional clubs. Tenerife and Las Palmas contest the Canary Islands derby.

History

Club Deportivo Tenerife was founded in 1912 as Sporting Club Tenerife, which had come about as a merger between two or more previous football clubs on the island. The club changed its name to Club Deportivo Tenerife in 1922. La Liga started in 1928, but the team played in regional divisions until it was promoted to the Segunda División in 1953. It first reached the top flight in 1961, being immediately relegated back and, in the following 27 years, played almost exclusively in the second level, also spending three years in Tercera División and six – five in a row – in Segunda División B, the newly created division three (in 1978).

In 1985, when Tenerife were relegated to the third division for a second time, Javier Pérez became president of the club. The side was promoted this year to the second level and, two years later, returned to the first, after winning the promotion playoff against Real Betis (4–1 on aggregate).

In 1991, Jorge Valdano took charge of the club as manager, and the Argentine would help rob former side Real Madrid of two consecutive league titles in the last round, to the benefit of Barcelona. In the first season, the Canary Islands outfit barely avoided relegation, but would finish in a best-ever fifth position in the following year, eventually reaching the round of 16 in the subsequent UEFA Cup, losing to Juventus 2–4 on aggregate.

German Jupp Heynckes became head coach of Tenerife in 1995, leading the club to another fifth-placed finish and the quarter-finals of the Copa del Rey. In the 1996–97 UEFA Cup, the islanders fared better, reaching the last-four after defeating Maccabi Tel Aviv, Lazio, Feyenoord and Brøndby (the winner coming late in extra time from an Antonio Mata free-kick), only bowing out to eventual winners Schalke 04.

Tenerife then went on a downward spiral which eventually led to relegation to the "silver category" in 1999, prompting various managerial changes within the club. In 2001, the club was again promoted, led by Rafael Benítez, who promptly left to take up the manager's job at Valencia; the promotion was achieved in the last match of the campaign thanks to a goal from Hugo Morales.

Pepe Mel became the new trainer but the first division season never took off, as Tenerife were beaten heavily at home by Barcelona 0–6, which cost the manager his job. Javier Clemente, formerly with the Spain national team, took the reins, but could not help prevent the eventual immediate relegation.

Tenerife suffered from serious economic problems in the following years, owing more than €40 million. President Pérez was replaced with Víctor Perez de Ascanio, who resigned due to bad management, leaving his position to Miguel Concepción, who negotiated with local politicians and businessmen, also creating a construction company as a subsidiary of the side.

On 13 June 2009, Tenerife secured a top flight return after a seven-year absence after a 1–0 win at Girona. In the following season, even though the team held on until the last round, another relegation befell, after the 0–1 loss at third-placed Valencia.

2010–11 brought with it three coaching changes, as Tenerife eventually suffered another relegation, returning to the third division after 24 years. On 2 June 2013, the club, led by Álvaro Cervera, returned to the second level after winning the promotion play-off against Hospitalet (3–2 on aggregate).

Seasons

Season to season

13 seasons in La Liga
46 seasons in Segunda División
8 seasons in Segunda División B
3 seasons in Tercera División

European cup history

Honours

Domestic
Copa del Rey
Semi-finals (1): 1993–94
Quarter-finals (4): 1960–61, 1961–62, 1975–76, 1995–96

Continental
UEFA Cup / UEFA Europa League
Semi-finals (1): 1996–97

Friendly
Joan Gamper Trophy
Winners (1): 1993

Current squad
.

Reserve team

Out on loan

Current technical staff

International players

Notable coaches

Fans
Fans of Tenerife are called Chicharreros because in early days, the inhabitants of a small fishing village called Santa Cruz (later the capital of Tenerife) consumed "chicharros" (Atlantic horse mackerel) as a main part of their diet.

Other inhabitants of Tenerife and the Canary Islands used the moniker as a pejorative name, but finally the inhabitants of Santa Cruz accepted it affectionately.

See also
CD Tenerife B

References

External links

Official website 
Futbolme.com profile 
Armada Sur, fansite
Frente Blanquiazul, fansite

 
Football clubs in the Canary Islands
Association football clubs established in 1912
Sport in Santa Cruz de Tenerife
1912 establishments in Spain
Segunda División clubs
La Liga clubs